Jack Richard Collins (August 24, 1918 – January 31, 2005) was an American film, stage and television actor. He played Mike Brady's boss, Mr. Phillips, in the television series The Brady Bunch, and Peter Christopher's boss, baby-food manufacturer Max Brahms, in the short-lived sitcom television series Occasional Wife. For filmgoers, Collins is easily best remembered for having played San Francisco Mayor Robert Ramsay in Irwin Allen's all-star-cast, box-office-smash, disaster-movie epic The Towering Inferno (1974).

Collins made numerous guest appearances in many television shows. He also appeared in several TV commercials. His acting appearances included  The Phil Silvers Show, Gunsmoke, Bonanza, Mission Impossible, The Addams Family, My Favorite Martian, Bewitched, I Dream of Jeannie, The Lucy Show, Petticoat Junction, The Odd Couple, Adam-12, Mod Squad, Ironside, The Partridge Family, The Waltons, Chico and the Man, Cannon, The Rockford Files,  CHiPs, Matt Houston and Dallas.

Collins died on January 31, 2005, in Los Angeles, California, at the age of 86.

TV and filmography

 Rock, Rock, Rock (1956) – Father
 Bewitched (1965-1972, TV Series) – Mr. Robbins / Jamieson / Mr. Prescott / Joseph Hinkley, Sr. / Mr. Harper / Jack Rogers
 I Dream of Jeannie (1965, TV Series) – General Hadley
 The Addams Family (1966, TV Series) – Dr. Bird
 My Favorite Martian (1966, TV Series) – Sam
 Petticoat Junction (1966, TV Series) – Hubert Thatcher
 The Lucy Show (1968, TV Series) – Ernie Williams / Rocky
 Adam-12 (1968, TV Series) – Mr. Purdy
 Ironside (1968, TV Series) – Corning
 Bonanza (1969-1972, TV Series) – Mayor Harlow / Mayor / Mayor Ned Blaine / Mayor Corey / Banker
 The Brady Bunch (1970-1971, TV Series) – Mr. Phillips
 The Partridge Family (1970-1974, TV Series) – Mayor Towbin / M. C. / Investor
 Mod Squad (1971, TV Series) – Andy Staton
 Gunsmoke (1971, TV Series) – J. Stedman Edgecomb
 The Jimmy Stewart Show (1972, TV series) – Bronco Lewis
 The Waltons (1972, TV Series) – Col. Tecumseh Henderson
 The Odd Couple (1972-1974, TV Series) – Albert (Zebra) / Brother Samuel
 The Other (1972) – Mr. P.C. Pretty
 Get to Know Your Rabbit (1972) – Mr. Reese
 Here's Lucy (1973) - one episode, "Tipsy through the Tulips"
 Mission Impossible (1973, TV Series) – Admiral
 Emperor of the North Pole (1973) – Dispatcher (uncredited)
 The Sting (1973) – Duke Boudreau
 Break Up (1973) – Himself
 The Towering Inferno (1974) – Mayor Ramsay
 Death Sentence (1974) – Willis Wright
 Linda Lovelace for President (1975) – Honest John
 Chico and the Man (1975, TV Series) – Customer
 Cannon (1975, TV Series) – Mr. Olsen / Edinger
 Flood! (1976, TV Movie) – Jack Spangler
 The Trial of Lee Harvey Oswald (1977, TV Movie) – Judge Claymore
 Pete's Dragon (1977) – Fisherman #3
 The Rockford Files (1977-1979, TV Series) – Dr. Wetherford / Victor Kreski / Frank Martin / Finn O'Herlihy
 Goin' Coconuts (1978) – Charlie
 CHiPs (1979-1981, TV Series) – Store Manager / Lem Dover
 Dallas (1982-1987, TV Series) – Russell Slater
 Jekyll and Hyde... Together Again (1982) – Baron Von Horsch
 Matt Houston (1984, TV Series) – Priest
 The Nest (1988) – Shakey Jake (final film role)

References

External links

1918 births
2005 deaths
People from Brooklyn
American male film actors
American male stage actors
American male television actors
Male actors from Los Angeles
Male actors from New York (state)
20th-century American male actors